The Pinewild Women's Championship was a golf tournament on the LPGA Tour, played only in 1995. It was played at the Pinewild Country Club of Pinehurst in Pinehurst, North Carolina. Rosie Jones was the winner, beating Dottie Pepper on the first hole of a sudden-death playoff.

References

External links
Pinewild Country Club of Pinehurst

Former LPGA Tour events
Golf in North Carolina
Women's sports in North Carolina